Valentin Wirz (born September 9, 1981) is a Swiss professional ice hockey player. He is currently playing for the SC Bern of Switzerland's National League A.

References

External links

1981 births
Living people
SC Bern players
Swiss ice hockey left wingers
People from Fribourg
Sportspeople from the canton of Fribourg